The table below lists the judgments of the Constitutional Court of South Africa delivered in 2001.

The members of the court during 2001 were President Arthur Chaskalson, Deputy President Pius Langa, and judges Lourens Ackermann, Richard Goldstone, Johann Kriegler, Tholie Madala, Yvonne Mokgoro, Sandile Ngcobo, Kate O'Regan, Albie Sachs and Zak Yacoob. In November the Sixth Amendment of the Constitution of South Africa renamed the post of President of the Constitutional Court to Chief Justice of South Africa, and the post of Deputy President to Deputy Chief Justice.

References
 
 

2001
Constitutional Court
Constitutional Court of South Africa